Bayevo is a rural locality (a selo) and the administrative center of Bayevsky District of Altai Krai, Russia. Population: . The population estimate as of 2016 was 4,188

Geography
The village is located by the Kulunda River on the Kulunda Plain, 230 km from Barnaul and 37 km from the nearest railway station (Gilyovka).

Ethnicity
The village is inhabited by Russians, Germans, Ukrainians, Kazakhs and others.

References

Notes

Sources

Rural localities in Bayevsky District